The 2010 Austrian Open Kitzbühel was a professional tennis tournament played on outdoor red clay courts. It was the eight edition of the tournament which is part of the 2010 ATP Challenger Tour. It took place in Kitzbühel, Austria between 2 and 8 August 2010.

Guillermo García-López won in the singles competition and André Sá and Marcelo Melo in the doubles competition in 2009, when the tournament was part of the ATP World Tour 250 series.

ATP entrants

Seeds

 Rankings are as of July 26, 2010.

Other entrants
The following players received wildcards into the singles main draw:
  Pablo Cuevas
  Thomas Muster
  Nicolas Reissig
  Dominic Thiem

The following players received a Special Exempt into the main draw:
  Evgeny Donskoy
  Marek Semjan

The following players received entry from the qualifying draw:
  Andreas Haider-Maurer
  Gerald Kamitz
  Jan Minář
  Grzegorz Panfil

Champions

Singles

 Andreas Seppi def.  Victor Crivoi, 6–2, 6–1

Doubles

 Dustin Brown /  Rogier Wassen def.  Hans Podlipnik-Castillo /  Max Raditschnigg, 3–6, 7–5, [10–7]

External links
Official site
ITF Search 
2010 Draws

Austrian Open Kitzbuhel
2010 in Austrian tennis
Austrian Open Kitzbühel